Eureka Stockade is a 1984 Australian miniseries based on the battle of Eureka Stockade. It reunited the producer, writer and star of A Town Like Alice.

Cast
 Bryan Brown - Peter Lalor
 Bill Hunter - Timothy Hayes
 Carol Burns - Anastasia Hayes
 Amy Madigan - Sarah Jamieson
 Tom Burlinson - Father Smythe
 Brett Cullen - Charles Ross
Penelope Stewart as Alicia Dunne
Stephen Hayes as Johan Gregorious
Rod Mullinar as Vern
Tim Hughes as Sgt. Major Tyler
Roger L. Howell as Raffaello Carboni
Edwin Hodgeman as Commissioner Rede
David Ravenswood  as Sir Charles Hotham
Fred Steele as John Joseph
Simon Chilvers as Bishop Goold
John Murphy as Father Downing
Tommy Dysart as Tom Kennedy
Peter Crossley as Johnstone
Sam Petersen as Johnny Hayes
Reg Evans as Goodenough
Luke Gallagher as 'Starry' Hayes
Troy Ellis as William Hayes
Melissa Crawford as Annie Hayes
James Crawford  as Timmy Hayes
David Bradshaw as Sgt. Major Milne
John Larking as Bentley
Roger Oakley as Scobie
Peter Collingwood as General Nickle
Geoff Warren as Dr. Kenworthy
Edward Caddick as Father Dunne
Peter Curtin as Attorney General
Lee James as Aspinall
Ruth Yaffe as Mrs. Bentley
Victor Kazan as John D'Ewes
Chris Hession as James McGill
William Zappa as Flash Burke
Bruce Knappett as Peter Martin
Andrew Martin as Hummfray
Chris Hallam as Dr. D.J. Williams
Tim Hardiman as Barnard Welch
Anthony Hawkins as Dr. Stewart
Peter Green as Patrick Carroll
Frank Thring as Judge

Production
The series was researched over two years and filmed over four months. It was shot on location near Ballarat and Bendigo. It was a difficult shoot as it took place during a heatwave. A $250,000 set of the British camp was almost destroyed during the Ash Wednesday bushfires. A Eureka flag was stolen during filming.

Reception
The series was a ratings disappointment compared to A Town Like Alice. However it sold widely overseas and screened in the US.

References

External links
Eureka Stockade at IMDb
Eureka Stockade at Letterbox DVD

Television shows set in colonial Australia
1980s Australian television miniseries
1984 Australian television series debuts
1984 Australian television series endings